Douglas William Shanks (born 1947) is an American college baseball coach, who is the current head baseball coach of the Central Hinds Academy. He is also the former City Commissioner of Jackson, Mississippi and was on their city council. He served as the head coach of the Mississippi Valley State Devils (2001–2014).

Political career 
Shanks had wanted to become the mayor of Jackson, Mississippi, since he was a teenager. Before 1977, he served as the Jackson director of public relations. He was the city commissioner of Jackson, Mississippi from 1973 to 1977, under mayor Russell C. Davis. In 1973, he became the first Republican to serve on the Jackson City Council. In 1977 and 1981, as a Republican, he ran for mayor against Democrat Dale Danks, but lost.

Coaching career
In 2001, Shanks became the first white head coach of a major sport at Mississippi Valley State, when he became the head baseball coach there. After 14 seasons at Mississippi Valley State University, Shanks retired from coaching college baseball to become the head coach at Central Hinds Academy.

Book 
In 2020, Shanks co-wrote and published a book that details the history of southern Jackson from 1945 to 1965, called One Direction Home.

Personal life 
Shanks is the son of Fred David and Frances (McMillan) Shanks. Shanks graduated from Provine High School in 1964. He married Kay Guest in 1975.

Head coaching record

References

External links
Mississippi Valley State Delta Devils bio

Living people
1947 births
High school baseball coaches in the United States
Liberty University alumni
Mississippi Valley State Delta Devils baseball coaches
Mississippi city council members
Mississippi Republicans